The 2017 Chesapeake Bayhawks season was the seventeenth season of the Chesapeake Bayhawks in Major League Lacrosse, and eighth season using the Chesapeake moniker. This season the team added some key young players including Lyle Thompson, Josh Byrne, Isaiah Davis-Allen, Jake Froccaro, and Ben Williams. The Bayhawks, in a three-year playoff drought, entered the season trying to improve upon their 8–6 record in 2016. Despite being one of the seven teams tied atop the 2016 standings with an 8–6 record, the Bayhawks did not make the postseason due to tiebreaker procedures.

The defending champion Denver Outlaws beat the visiting Bayhawks 12–11 in overtime in the next-to-last game of the season. This third overtime defeat of the season knocked Chesapeake out of the playoffs. However, they managed to finish 7–7 by bouncing back in the final game to defeat the Outlaws at home 23–19. Josh Byrne scored seven goals and set a league record for goals in a season by a rookie with 39. Byrne's 39 goals –  in only 9 games – also led the entire league in 2017.

Schedule

Regular season

Standings

Roster

References

External links

Chesapeake Bayhawks seasons
Chesapeake Bayhawks
Chesapeake Bayhawks